Kevin Maher (born 1976) is an English association football player.

Kevin Maher may also refer to:

Kevin Maher (American soccer), retired American soccer player
Kevin James Maher (born 1988), Canadian musician and producer
Kevin Maher (writer) (born 1972), Irish writer